Bryceomys is an extinct mammal that lived during the late Cretaceous period (between 100 and 66 million years ago) and thus shared the world with dinosaurs. It was a member of the also extinct order of Multituberculata. It was within the suborder of Cimolodonta, and a member of the Paracimexomys group.

The genus Bryceomys ("Bryce mouse", after Bryce Canyon National Park) was named by Eaton J.G. in 1995.

Species
The species Bryceomys fumosus (Eaton 1995) is known from fossils found in strata dating to the Turonian (Upper Cretaceous) in the Straight Cliffs Formation of Utah, US.  They probably weighed about 12g, about half the weight of a house mouse.  About a hundred teeth are held at the Oklahoma Museum of Natural History, including the holotype.

Species: Bryceomys hadrosus Eaton J.G. 1995
Place: Straight Cliffs Formation of Utah
Age: Turonian (Upper Cretaceous)
Also in the Oklahoma collection. Suggested bodyweight is around 90 g.

Species: Bryceomys intermedius Eaton JG & Cifelli RL, 2001
Place: Cedar Mountain Formation, Utah
Age: Albian (late) - Cenomanian (early) (Upper Cretaceous)

References
 Eaton (1995), "Cenomanian and Turonian (Early Late Cretaceous) multituberculate mammals from southwestern Utah". Journal of Vert Paleo 15(4), p. 761-784.
 Eaton and Cifelli (2001), "Multituberculate mammals from near the Early-Late Cretaceous boundary, Cedar Mountain Formation, Utah". Acta Palaeontologica Polonica 46(4), p. 453-518
 Kielan-Jaworowska Z & Hurum JH (2001), "Phylogeny and Systematics of multituberculate mammals". Paleontology 44, p. 389-429.

Cimolodonts
Late Cretaceous mammals of North America
Fossil taxa described in 1995
Prehistoric mammal genera